Northern or North Sámi (disapproved exonym Lappish or Lapp) is the most widely spoken of all Sámi languages. The area where Northern Sámi is spoken covers the northern parts of Norway, Sweden and Finland. The number of Northern Sámi speakers is estimated to be somewhere between 15,000 and 25,000. About 2,000 of these live in Finland and between 5,000 and 6,000 in Sweden, with the remaining portions being in Norway.

History

Among the first printed Sámi texts is Svenske och Lappeske ABC Book ("Swedish and Lappish ABC book"), written in Swedish and what is likely a form of Northern Sámi. It was published in two editions in 1638 and 1640 and includes 30 pages of prayers and confessions of Protestant faith. It has been described as the first book "with a regular Sámi language form".

Northern Sámi was first described by Knud Leem (En lappisk Grammatica efter den Dialect, som bruges af Field-Lapperne udi Porsanger-Fiorden) in 1748 and in dictionaries in 1752 and 1768. One of Leem's fellow grammaticians, who had also assisted him, was Anders Porsanger, himself Sámi and in fact the first Sámi to receive higher education, who studied at the Trondheim Cathedral School and other schools, but who was unable to publish his work on Sámi due to racist attitudes at the time. The majority of his work has disappeared.

In 1832, Rasmus Rask published the highly influential Ræsonneret lappisk Sproglære ('Reasoned Sámi Grammar'), Northern Sámi orthography being based on his notation (according to E. N. Setälä).

Assimilation

The mass mobilization during the Alta controversy as well as a more tolerant political environment caused a change to the Norwegian policy of assimilation during the last decades of the twentieth century.
In Norway, Northern Sámi is currently an official language in the county Troms og Finnmark and six municipalities (Kautokeino, Karasjok, Nesseby, Tana, Porsanger and Gáivuotna (Kåfjord)). Sámi born before 1977 have never learned to write Sámi according to the currently used orthography in school, so it is only in recent years that there have been Sámi capable of writing their own language for various administrative positions.

In the 1980s, a Northern Sámi Braille alphabet was developed, based on the Scandinavian Braille alphabet but with seven additional letters (á, č, đ, ŋ, š, ŧ, ž) required for writing in Northern Sámi.

Phonology

Consonants

The consonant inventory of Northern Sámi is large, contrasting voicing for many consonants. However, these can be treated as clusters for the purpose of phonology, since they are clearly composed of two segments and only the first of these lengthens in quantity 3. The terms "preaspirated" and "pre-stopped" will be used in this article to describe these combinations for convenience.

Notes:
 Voiceless stops have voiced or partly voiced allophones when they occur adjacent to voiced sounds, and sometimes also word-initially.
 Stops before a homorganic nasal are realised as unreleased stops. Some, particularly younger, speakers instead realise voiceless stops as a glottal stop  in this position, and decompose voiced stops into a homorganic nasal + glottal stop combination (etc.).
Although  is a fricative, it behaves phonologically like an approximant, in particular like .
 Quantity 3 geminated plain stops and affricates (written bb, dd, zz, žž, ddj, gg) are variously described as voiced or partly voiced.
 Voiceless sonorants are very rare, but occur more frequently as allophonic realisations. Voiceless  only occurs this way, and is quite rare.
 A combination of  followed by a stop or affricate in the onset (etc.) is realised as preaspiration.
  is extremely rare.

Dialectal variation

Not all Northern Sámi dialects have identical consonant inventories. Some consonants are absent from some dialects, while others are distributed differently.

 Western Finnmark lacks , using  in its place.
 Eastern Finnmark does not have voiced pre-stopped nasals, replacing them with voiceless equivalents.
 Sea Sámi does not have pre-stopped nasals at all, having geminate nasals in their place.
 The postaspirated stops do not occur in Western Finnmark dialects, plain stops are used instead. They occur only in recent loanwords from the Scandinavian languages, and only before a stressed syllable when not next to another consonant.

Consonant length and gradation

Consonants, including clusters, that occur after a stressed syllable can occur in multiple distinctive length types, or quantities. These are conventionally labelled quantity 1, 2 and 3 or Q1, Q2 and Q3 for short. The consonants of a word alternate in a process known as consonant gradation, where consonants appear in different quantities depending on the specific grammatical form. Normally, one of the possibilities is named the strong grade, while the other is named weak grade. The consonants of a weak grade are normally quantity 1 or 2, while the consonants of a strong grade are normally quantity 2 or 3.

 Quantity 1 includes any single consonant. It originates from Proto-Samic single consonants in the weak grade.
 Quantity 2 includes any combination of consonants (including two of the same) with a short consonant in the coda of the preceding syllable (in Eastern Finnmark, any combination of consonants preceded by a long vowel or diphthong). It originates from Proto-Samic single consonants in the strong grade, as well as combinations of two consonants in the weak grade.
 Quantity 3 includes any combination of consonants (including two of the same) with a long consonant in the coda of the preceding syllable (in Eastern Finnmark, any combination of consonants preceded by a short vowel or diphthong). It originates from Proto-Samic combinations of two consonants in the strong grade.

Throughout this article and related articles, consonants that are part of different syllables are written with two consonant letters in IPA, while the lengthening of consonants in quantity 3 is indicated with an IPA length mark.

Not all consonants can occur in every quantity type. The following limitations exist:
 Single  is restricted to quantity 1, and does not alternate.
 Postaspirated consonants do not occur after a stressed syllable, and thus do not have any quantity distinctions.
 Voiced stops and affricates only occur in quantity 3. In quantity 1, voiced stops are allophones of the corresponding voiceless stops.
 ,  and  occur in quantity 2 and 3, but not in quantity 1.

When a consonant can occur in all three quantities, quantity 3 is termed "overlong".

This vowel assimilates to the quality of the surrounding vowels:
 Between two rounded vowels (but not the diphthong ) in the adjacent syllables, it becomes .
 Before a front vowel in the next syllable, it becomes , e.g. muorji , phonetically .
 Otherwise, it becomes , e.g. silba , phonetically .
This does not occur if the second consonant is a dental/alveolar stop, e.g. gielda , phonetically , or sálti , phonetically .

Vowels
Northern Sámi possesses the following vowels:

The semivowels still behave as consonants in clusters.

Not all of these vowel phonemes are equally prevalent; some occur generally while others occur only in specific contexts as the result of sound changes. The following rules apply for stressed syllables:
 The other long vowels occur only in the context of diphthong simplification (below).
 Short  is rare, and mostly occurs due to the combination of diphthong simplification plus stressed vowel shortening.
 Rising diphthongs and half-long  occur only due to unstressed vowel shortening in the next syllable.

The distribution in post-stressed syllables (unstressed syllables following a stressed one) is more restricted:
 Short  and long ,  and  occur generally.
 Short  and  occur more rarely, sometimes from Proto-Samic *i and *u and sometimes as a result of unstressed vowel shortening.
 Short  and  occur only before .

The standard orthography of Northern Sámi distinguishes vowel length in the case of   versus  , although this is primarily on an etymological basis. Some dialects also have lengthening of  under certain circumstances. Nonetheless, a default length can be assumed for these two letters. For the remaining vowels, vowel length is not indicated in the standard orthography. In reference works, macrons can be placed above long vowels that occur in a position where they can be short.

Dialectal variation
The Eastern Finnmark dialects possess additional contrasts that other dialects of Northern Sámi do not:
 There is a length contrast between short and long diphthongs. In other dialects, this distinction exists as well, but is allophonic.

Phonological processes

Diphthong simplification

Diphthong simplification, also known as umlaut, is a process whereby a diphthong loses its second component and becomes a long monophthong:
 ie → ī: viehkat  "to run" → vīhken  "I ran"
 ea → ē: geassi  "summer" → gēsiid  "of the summers"
 oa → ō: goarrut  "to sew" → gōrro!  "sew!"
 uo → ū: muorra  "tree" → mūrrii  "into the tree"

Historically, diphthong simplification was caused by a short i or u in the following syllable, the same conditioning that still exists in neighbouring Lule Sámi.

The process is complicated by two factors. Firstly, vowel length is not indicated in the spelling, so it's not possible to tell whether the first vowel in ui is short or long. It is short in the illative singular and thus causes simplification (viessu "house" → vīssui "into the house"), but it is long in the plural forms and does not cause any simplification (viessūide "into the houses"). A second complicating factor is that under some circumstances, original long i and u in unstressed syllables have shortened to e and o (denoted in grammars and dictionaries with an underdot ẹ and ọ to distinguish them). These shortened vowels do not cause simplification, but are indistinguishable from the older originally short vowels that do trigger it. These cases must simply be memorised.

Unstressed vowel shortening

Shortening of long vowels in unstressed syllables occurs irregularly. It commonly occurs in the first element of a compound word, in a fourth syllable, and in various other unpredictable circumstances. Shortened vowels are denoted here, and in other reference works, with an underdot: ạ, ẹ, ọ, to distinguish them from originally-short vowels.

When a long vowel or diphthong occurs in the stressed syllable before the shortened vowel, it becomes half-long/rising.
   "oldest" (nom. sg.) ~ boarásēpmosa  (acc. sg.)
   "fearless" (nom. sg.) ~ baluhēmiid  (acc. pl.)

When the consonant preceding the shortened vowel is quantity 3, any lengthened elements are shortened so that it becomes quantity 2. However, the resulting consonant is not necessarily the weak-grade equivalent of that consonant. If the consonant was previously affected by consonant lengthening (below), this process shortens it again.

   "mother" →   "mother pig"; contrast the weak grade in  
   "year" → jahkẹbealli  "half-year"

Stressed vowel shortening

In the Eastern Finnmark dialects, long vowels as well as diphthongs are shortened before a quantity 3 consonant. This is phonemic due to the loss of length in quantity 3 in these dialects.
   "mother" (nom. sg.) ~ etniid  (gen. pl.)
   "waterfall" (nom. sg.) ~ guikii  (ill. sg.)
   "teaching" (nom. sg.) ~ oahpa  (acc. sg.)
   "guest" (nom. sg.) ~ guossi  (acc. sg.)
   "grandmother" (nom. sg.) ~ áhku  (acc. sg.)

Outside Eastern Finnmark, long  is only shortened before a long preaspirate, not before any other consonants. The shortening of diphthongs remains allophonic due to the preservation of quantity 3 length, but the shortening of long vowels that result from diphthong simplification is phonemic.

Stressed vowel lengthening
In the Eastern Finnmark dialects, short vowels are lengthened when they occur before a quantity 1 or 2 consonant. Combined with the preceding change, vowel length in stressed syllables becomes conditioned entirely by the following consonant quantity. Moreover, because the coda lengthening in quantity 3 is lost in these dialects, vowel length becomes the only means for distinguishing quantities 3 and 2 in many cases.

   "lock" (nom. sg.) ~   (acc. sg.)
   "nail" (nom. sg.) ~   (acc. sg.)
   "cat" (nom. sg.) ~   (acc. sg.)

Lengthening of unstressed short /a/

In the Western Finnmark dialects, a short  in a post-stressed syllable is lengthened to  if the preceding consonants are quantity 1 or 2, and the preceding syllable contains a short vowel. Compare the Eastern Finnmark pronunciations of these words under "stressed vowel lengthening".

   "lock" (nom. sg.) ~   (acc. sg.).
   "nail" (nom. sg.) ~   (acc. sg.)
   "cloud" (nom. sg.) ~   (acc. sg.)

A long  that originates from this process does not trigger consonant lengthening.

Consonant lengthening

In dialects outside Eastern Finnmark, in quantity 2, the last coda consonant is lengthened if the following vowel is long, and the preceding vowel is a short monophthong. Since the coda now contains a long consonant, it is considered as quantity 3, but the lengthening is mostly allophonic and is not indicated orthographically.

The new consonant may coincide with its Q3 consonant gradation counterpart, effectively making a weak grade strong, or it may still differ in other ways. In particular, no change is made to syllable division, so that in case of Q2 consonants with a doubled final consonant, it is actually the first of this pair that lengthens, making it overlong.

   "year" (nom. sg.) ~ jagi  (acc. sg.)
   "fear" (nom. sg.) ~ balu  (acc. sg.)
   "sum" (nom. sg.) ~ supmi  (acc. sg.); contrast   "polar night" ~ skápma  (acc. sg.)
   "eye" (nom. sg.) ~ čalmmi  (acc. sg.); contrast   "palm tree" ~ bálmma  (acc. sg.)
   "bird" (nom. sg.) ~ lotti  (acc. sg.); contrast   "period" ~ botta  (acc. sg.)

In this case, the diphthong also shortens before the new quantity 3 consonant.
  , phonetically  "protection" (nom. sg.) ~ duotti , phonetically  (acc. sg.); contrast  "track, trail" , phonetically  ~ luotta  (acc. sg.) with no lengthening.
  , phonetically  "field" (nom. sg.) ~ gietti , phonetically  (acc. sg.)

Prosody

Stress is generally not phonemic in Northern Sámi; the first syllable of a word always carries primary stress. Like most Sámi languages, Northern Sámi follows a pattern of alternating (trochaic) stress, in which each odd-numbered syllable after the first is secondarily stressed and even-numbered syllables are unstressed. The last syllable of a word is never stressed, unless the word has only one syllable.

Consequently, words can follow three possible patterns:
 A single stressed syllable.
 An even number of syllables: Ending in a stressed odd-numbered syllable followed by an unstressed even-numbered syllable.
 An odd number of syllables: Ending in a stressed odd-numbered syllable followed by an unstressed even-numbered syllable, and an unstressed odd-numbered (final) syllable.
This gives the following pattern, which can be extended indefinitely in theory. S indicates stress, _ indicates no stress:
 S
 S _
 S _ _
 S _ S _
 S _ S _ _
 S _ S _ S _
 etc.

The number of syllables, and the resulting stress pattern, is important for grammatical reasons. Words with stems having an even number of syllables from the last inflect differently from words with stems having an odd number of syllables. This is detailed further in the grammar section.

In compound words, which consist of several distinct word roots, each word retains its own stress pattern, potentially breaking from the normal trochaic pattern. If the first element of a compound has an odd number of syllables, then there will be a sequence of two unstressed syllables followed by a stressed one, which does not occur in non-compound words. In some cases, the first element of a compound has only one syllable, resulting in two adjacent stressed syllables. Hence, stress is lexically significant in that it can distinguish compounds from non-compounds.

Recent loanwords generally keep the stress of the language they were borrowed from, assigning secondary stress to the syllable that was stressed in the original word. The normal trochaic pattern can also be broken in this case, but words will still be made to fit into the even or odd inflection patterns. Words with penultimate stress ending in a consonant will follow the odd inflection:
   "neon"
   "apostle"

Words with antepenultimate or earlier stress will have the stress modified, as this is not allowed in Northern Sámi:
   "pineapple"
   "Africa"
   "America"

Final stress is not allowed, so if the original word has final stress, an extra dummy syllable (generally a) is added in Northern Sámi to avoid this.
   "car"
   "bomb"
   "culture"
   "adverb"
   "tomato"
   "lawyer"
   "capacity"
   "mathematics"

As a result of retaining the original stress pattern, some loanwords have sequences of three unstressed syllables, which don't occur in any other environment:
   "to specialise"
   "to theorise"
   "administration"

Conjunctions, postpositions, particles, and monosyllabic pronouns tend to be unstressed altogether, and therefore fall outside the above rules.

Dialects

Sammallahti divides Northern Sámi dialects as follows:
 Finnmark dialects
 Western Finnmark: eastern Enontekiö, northern Sodankylä and part of Inari in Finland, Kautokeino and Alta in Norway
 Eastern Finnmark: Utsjoki and part of Inari in Finland, Karasjok, Porsanger and Tana in Norway
 Torne dialects
 Finnish Wedge: western Enontekiö in Finland, Skibotnelva, Gálggojávri and Nordreisa in Norway
 Karesuando: Könkämävuoma and Lainiovuoma in Sweden, Lyngen and Balsfjord in Norway
 Jukkasjärvi: Saarivuoma, Talma, Rautasvuoma and Kaalasvuoma in Sweden, Vågsfjord and Ofotfjord in Norway
 Kaitum: Norrkaitum and Mellanbyn in Sweden
 Sea Sámi

The written language is primarily based on the western Finnmark dialects, with some elements from the eastern Finnmark dialects.

Western Finnmark dialects

Features of the western Finnmark dialects are:
 Merging of the velar nasals into the palatal nasals, except before a (plain or preaspirated) homorganic stop.
 Lengthening of short  when the preceding syllable contains a short vowel and a quantity 1 or 2 consonant. This new long  does not trigger consonant lengthening.
 Kautokeino: Merging of  into .
 Kautokeino: Assibilation of  into .

Eastern Finnmark dialects
The eastern Finnmark dialects have the following characteristics:

 Lengthening of stressed vowels before quantity 1 and 2 consonants.
 Shortening of the first element of quantity 3 consonants, merging them with quantity 2 consonants (unless the second element of the corresponding Q2 consonant is doubled, which keeps them distinct). Combined with the previous change, this causes Q3-Q2 gradation in Eastern Finnmark to become primarily about vowel length rather than consonant length.
 Umlaut: fronting of vowels before a following front vowel in the second syllable (including  produced by the previous change).

Torne dialects
 Jukkasjärvi, Karesuando, Finnish Wedge: Loss of distinction between postalveolar and plain alveolar consonants, with the result being alveolar in Karesuando and postalveolar in the Finnish Wedge.
 Use of -n instead of -s in the locative singular. This originates from the old inessive case, whereas the standard ending is from the old elative case.
 Use of -o instead of -u in the third-person singular present tense.
 Jukkasjärvi and Kaitum: Use of -is instead of -in in the locative plural. Again, these originate from two different older cases.

Sea Sámi dialects
 Use of -st instead of -s in the locative singular.
 Eastern Sea Sámi: Loss of distinction between postalveolar and plain alveolar consonants.

Orthography

Northern Sámi has a long orthographic history, which has had no fewer than 9 Latin alphabets.

History

The roots of the current orthography for Northern Sámi were laid by Rasmus Rask who, after discussions with Nils Vibe Stockfleth, published Ræsonneret lappisk sproglære efter den sprogart, som bruges af fjældlapperne i Porsangerfjorden i Finmarken. En omarbejdelse af Prof. Knud Leems Lappiske grammatica in 1832. Rask opted for a phonemic orthographic system. All of the orthographies that have been used for Northern Sámi trace their roots back to Rask's system, unlike the orthographies used for Lule and Southern Sámi, which are mainly based on the orthographical conventions of Swedish and Norwegian. Following in the tradition of Rask meant that diacritics were used with some consonants (č, đ, ŋ, š, ŧ and ž), which caused data-processing problems before Unicode was introduced. Both Stockfleth and J. A. Friis went on to publish grammar books and dictionaries for Sámi. It can be said that Northern Sámi was better described than Norwegian was before Ivar Aasen published his grammar on Norwegian.

Northern Sámi was and is used in three countries, each of which used its own orthography for years. Friis' orthography was used when work on translating the Bible into Northern Sámi commenced, in the first Sámi newspaper called Saǥai Muittalægje, and in the Finnemisjonen's own newspaper Nuorttanaste. The groundwork for Northern Sámi lexicography was laid by Konrad Nielsen who used an orthography of his own creation in his dictionary Lappisk ordbok. Starting in 1948, the orthographies used in Norway and Sweden were combined into a single Bergsland-Ruong orthography. It was not greatly used in Norway. In 1979, an official orthography for Northern Sámi was adopted for use in Norway, Sweden and Finland.

Thus, until the official orthography currently in use was adopted in 1979, each country had its own, slightly different standard, so it is quite possible to come across older books that are difficult to understand for people unacquainted with the orthography:

 
 

(The children have come to school.)

The first sentence is from Antti Outakoski's Samekiela kiellaoahpa from 1950; the second one is how it would be written according to the current orthography.

Alphabet

The most recent alphabet was approved in 1979 and last modified in 1985:

When typing, if there is no way of entering the letters particular to Northern Sámi (Čč Đđ Ŋŋ Šš Ŧŧ Žž) correctly, an acute accent is sometimes placed over the corresponding Latin letter as a substitute. These substitutions are still found in books printed after the common orthography was adopted due to system limitations when typing.

Marks used in reference works

Some additional marks are used in dictionaries, grammars and other reference works, including in this article. They are not used in normal writing. The following are used in Pekka Sammallahti's Sámi-suoma sátnegirji:
 A vertical mark ˈ or apostrophe or other similar mark is placed between a double consonant to indicate an overlong (quantity 3) consonant.
 The same mark may be used in the combination  to indicate the Q3 consonant cluster .
 A macron is placed above vowel letters to indicate a long vowel.
 A dot is placed below vowel letters to indicate an unstressed vowel that has been shortened, which in turn hints that preceding vowels are rising/half-long, and preceding Q3 consonants are shortened.

Multigraphs

Northern Sámi orthography includes many combinations of multiple letters. Overlong (quantity 3) consonants are not distinguished from regular double consonants, but are commonly denoted with a vertical mark between the two consonant letters (etc.) in reference works.

Combinations of different consonant letters stand for their equivalent individual phonemes, as described by the pronunciations of the individual letters, above. The last consonant in a sequence may be doubled. This indicates that the consonant cluster is quantity 2, while a cluster with an undoubled last consonant is generally quantity 3. It often also indicates a doubling of the corresponding consonant phoneme, but not if the preceding consonant is voiceless.

The following details combinations of multiple letters which are exceptions to the general pronunciation rules of each letter.

Diphthongs

The diphthongs, as may be expected, are written using a combination of two letters. Length is not indicated, nor is the distinction between normal and rising diphthongs.

Ending in 

The combinations ,  and  indicate ,  and  respectively. The first letter is doubled to indicate longer versions, and a vertical line is then used for overlong .

These two cases are distinguished by their behaviour in consonant gradation. In the first case,  appears in the strong grade while  appears in the weak grade, and these represent overlong  and long  respectively. In the second case, alternatively written ,  appears in the strong grade while  appears in the weak grade, representing the clusters  and  respectively.

Beginning with 

Preaspiration is indicated with a preceding . Long preaspiration is indicated by doubling the second letter. This is exactly the opposite of how normal clusters are written.

Voiceless sonorants are also indicated by a preceding , but they have three lengths. Overlong length is indicated by a vertical line in reference works, as with other sonorants.

Stop-nasal combinations

Pre-stopped nasal consonants (Q2) are indicated by a preceding letter for a voiceless stop. Voiced pre-stopped nasals (Q3) are written with a voiced stop in place of the voiceless one.

Hyphenation

With just a single consonant between syllables, the hyphen goes before that consonant.
 i-ja
 de-há-laš

If a word contains a double consonant letter, the hyphen is always placed between those two letters. The combination ij, when preceded by a vowel, counts as a double consonant and thus gets a hyphen in between.
 guol-li
 áhk-ká
 beaiv-váš
 krist-ta-laš
 bi-o-lo-gii-ja

With other combinations of two consonants, the hyphen goes between those. Again, if i counts as a consonant, it goes between that and the next one.
 Sáp-mi
 bái-di
 kon-sear-ta
 duos-tan

There are a few exceptions where the hyphen goes before all consonants.
 pro-gram-ma
 in-du-strii-ja

In compound words, a hyphen always goes between two parts of a compound.
 má-ilm-mi
 gas-ka-i-ja-beaiv-váš

Grammar

Northern Sámi is an agglutinative, highly inflected language that shares many grammatical features with the other Uralic languages. Sámi has also developed considerably into the direction of fusional and inflected morphology, much like Estonian to which it is distantly related. Therefore, morphemes are marked not only by suffixes but also by morphophonological modifications to the root. Of the various morphophonological alterations, the most important and complex is the system of consonant gradation.

Consonant gradation

Consonant gradation is a pattern of alternations between pairs of consonants that appears in the inflection of words. The system of consonant gradation in Northern Sámi is complex, especially compared to that found in the Finnic languages. A word stem can appear in two grades: the strong grade and the weak grade. A given word can alternate either between quantity 3 in the strong grade and quantity 2 in the weak grade, or between quantity 2 in the strong grade and quantity 1 in the weak grade. Historically, the weak grade appeared when the syllable following the consonant was closed (ended in a consonant), but the loss of certain vowels or consonants have obscured this in Northern Sámi and it is now a more-or-less opaque process.

In verbs, some nouns, and in some processes of word derivation, a Q2 strong grade can become "extra strong" Q3, alternating in all three quantities. This is caused by the historical loss of a consonant (often  or ) between the second and third syllable, which triggered compensatory lengthening on the gradating consonant.

Quantity 3 ~ 2 alternations

Alternations between quantities 3 and 2 are either consonant clusters or sequences of two identical consonants. In the strong grade, the first consonant forms the coda of the preceding syllable, and the remaining consonants form the onset of the following syllable. In the weak grade, only the last consonant belongs to the onset of the next syllable, and the remaining consonants belong to the coda of the preceding syllable. Thus, when there are three or more consonants, the syllable division changes between the grades. In addition, the strong grade by default has a lengthened consonant in the coda, while this lengthening is generally absent in the weak grade. However, this lengthening is subject to the modifying effects of consonant lengthening and unstressed vowel shortening, which can in some occasions level the length distinctions, so that length not an absolute indicator of grade (though it is of quantity). In Eastern Finnmark, no lengthening is found at all, instead of length the preceding vowel is short, while the vowel becomes long when the length would be absent.

Doubling of the last consonant is another distinguishing feature of the weak grade, although it only occurs if the preceding consonant is voiced. The additional consonant is always assigned to the coda (the double consonant is split between syllables), so that it obligatorily shifts the syllable boundary relative to the strong grade:
 vl  ~ vll 
 id  ~ idd 
Consonant lengthening can then, in turn, lengthen the first of this pair again (the one in the coda). In writing, the last consonant is doubled in the weak grade, even if the preceding consonant is voiceless, simply to distinguish the two grades visually:
 st  ~ stt 
 vst  ~ vstt 

Sequences of two identical consonants gradate in the same way, with lengthening of the first consonant in the strong grade (again, subject to modification, and not in Eastern Finnmark), but without any doubling of the last consonant in the weak grade. For most pairs of consonants, no difference is made between the grades orthographically, both are written with a double consonant. In reference works, the special mark ˈ is placed between the consonants to indicate the strong grade.

Some cases are indicated specially in the orthography, but behave as expected from a phonological point of view:
In Eastern Finnmark the length is lost, making both grades identical (but still with different preceding vowel lengths).
 hpp  (EF ) ~ hp 
 htt  (EF ) ~ ht 
 hcc  (EF ) ~ hc 
 hčč  (EF /h.t͡ʃ/) ~ hč 
 hkk  (EF ) ~ hk 
 Clusters of  plus pre-stopped nasal: orthographically indicated the same as lone pre-stopped nasals (below), but both grades have a voiceless stop, and differ only in the length of the first consonant and syllabification. In Eastern Finnmark, the stop is missing from the strong grade.
 rbm  (EF ) ~ rpm 
 rdn  (EF ) ~ rtn 
 rdnj  (EF ) ~ rtnj 
 rgŋ  (EF ) ~ rkŋ 
 Sequences of two : the strong grade is indicated by a doubled first consonant, the weak grade by only a single one. This is possible because this consonant cannot occur singly (as quantity 1).
 llj  ~ lj 
 Sequences of two : both grades are indicated identically. The strong grade can be distinguished with an overlength mark in reference works.
 nˈnj  ~ nnj 
 Sequences of two voiceless sonorants: both grades are indicated identically. The strong grade can be distinguished with an overlength mark in reference works.
 hjˈj  ~ hjj 
 hlˈl  ~ hll 
 hmˈm  ~ hmm 
 hnˈn  ~ hnn 
 hrˈr  ~ hrr 

In some clusters, there is an alternation in the quality of the first consonant between the two grades.
 kc  ~ vcc 
 ks  ~ vss 
 kst  ~ vstt 
 kt  ~ vtt 
 Clusters of pre-stopped nasals: a voiced stop occurs in the strong grade, and a voiceless stop in the weak grade. The voiceless stop, in turn, blocks doubling of the last consonant. In this case, however, there is no doubling in the orthography. In Eastern Finnmark, the stop is devoiced in the strong grade, making the two grades identical (but still with different preceding vowel lengths). In Sea Sámi, this alternation is replaced by geminate nasals.
 bm  (EF ) ~ pm 
 dn  (EF ) ~ tn 
 dnj  (EF ) ~ tnj 
 gŋ  (EF ) ~ kŋ 
 Clusters of a voiced consonant (except ) plus pre-stopped nasal: the stop is voiceless and occurs only in the strong grade, the weak grade has doubling of the nasal. In Eastern Finnmark, the stop is missing from the strong grade.
 lbm  (EF ) ~ lmm 
 idn  (EF ) ~ inn 
 vdnj  (EF ) ~ vnnj 
 lgŋ  (EF ) ~ lŋŋ 
 Sequences of two homorganic plain stops: the first stop is voiced in the strong grade, voiceless in the weak grade. The strong grade is represented orthographically by a pair of voiced consonants.
 bb  ~ pp 
 dd  ~ tt 
 gg  ~ kk 
 zz  ~ cc 
 žž  ~ čč 
 Sequences of two palatal stops: these are phonetically the same as the previous, but different orthographically.
 ddj  ~ dj

Quantity 2 ~ 1 alternations

Alternations between 2 and 1 are less predictable than alternations between quantities 3 and 2. The weak grade is always represented by a single consonant, which forms the onset of the next syllable, and the preceding syllable has no coda. The corresponding strong grade additionally has a single consonant in the coda, which may the same as the following onset consonant or different. The coda consonant in the strong grade may undergo consonant lengthening to receive additional length.

A double consonant in the strong grade always alternates with a single consonant in the weak grade. This occurs with all nasals, sonorants and fricatives (except  and ). Orthographically, this is represented as a double versus a single consonant letter.
 hrr  ~ hr 
 mm  ~ m 
 nnj  ~ nj 
 ss  ~ s 
 đđ  ~ đ 

A cluster of short  and a voiceless consonant (preaspirated) in the strong grade alternates with a single voiced consonant in the weak grade.
 hp  ~ b  ( in Eastern Finnmark)
 ht  ~ đ 
 hc  ~ z 
 hč  ~ ž 
 hk  ~ g  ( or zero in Eastern Finnmark)

A cluster of a voiceless pre-stopped nasal in the strong grade drops the stop in the weak grade. In Sea Sámi, the strong grade has a double nasal, without the stop.
 pm  ~ m 
 tn  ~ n 
 tnj  ~ nj 
 kŋ  ~ ŋ 

 dj  ~ j

Changes to word-final consonants

Only a limited number of consonants are allowed at the end of a word. Therefore, consonants will be modified when they come to stand word-finally:
 In the case of a consonant cluster, all consonants except the first are removed. The other rules are then applied to that consonant. Combinations of  plus a consonant are allowed, however.
 All stops, including preaspirated, become t . Combinations of  plus a stop become id .
 h also becomes t .
 All affricates become homorganic fricatives: c/z → s, č/ž → š.
 m becomes n. Some recent loanwords such as  retain m.
  becomes spelled , but there is no phonemic change.

Post-stressed vowel alternations

Certain inflectional endings and derivational suffixes trigger changes in the first unstressed (post-stressed) vowel of the stem. These changes are generally the result of umlaut effects in Proto-Samic. The following changes may be noted. An empty table cell means there is no change, S indicates diphthong simplification.

There are some vowel alternations that don't have a clear rule or cause. For example, the change of a to á in the present tense third-person singular of verbs is unexpected and must simply be taken as-is. Likewise, the appearance of u or o in some verb imperative forms is not based on any rule, but is an inherent part of the ending.

Inflection types

All inflected words, whether nouns, adjectives or verbs, can be divided into three main inflectional classes. The division is based on whether there is an even or odd number of syllables from the last stressed syllable to the end of the word.
 Words with even inflection (also called "vowel stems") have an even number of syllables from the last stressed syllable of the stem; usually two, but sometimes also four.
 Words with odd inflection (also called "consonant stems") have an odd number of syllables from the last stressed syllable of the stem; usually three, but very rarely one or five.
 Words with contracted inflection have an even number of syllables from the last stressed syllable of the stem, but have the consonant gradation pattern of odd-inflection words. If the gradation has three levels, the strong grade is always level 3.

For nouns and adjectives, the stem is taken from the accusative/genitive singular rather than the nominative, as the latter often drops the final vowel and sometimes also the preceding consonant. For verbs, the infinitive is used to determine the stem, by removing the infinitive ending -t.

Words with even and contracted inflection can be divided further, based on the final vowel of the stem. For even-inflected words, this vowel is most commonly a, i or u, while for contracted words it is mostly á, e or o. Words with odd inflection are not differentiated by stem-final vowel.

Nouns

Nouns inflect in singular (ovttaidlohku) and plural (máŋggaidlohku), and also in 7 cases. The following table shows the general endings; the actual forms can differ based on consonant gradation and the inflection type of the word.

The accusative and genitive are usually identical. There is no singular-plural distinction in the essive, so for example mánnán is interpreted as either "as a child" or "as children".

Even nouns

Nouns with even inflection have an inherent stem-final vowel. They also usually have consonant gradation of the last consonant in the stem, where the strong grade appears in the nominative singular, illative singular and essive, while the weak grade appears in the remaining forms.

Some even nouns do not gradate. These can generally be divided into two groups:
 Originally non-gradating odd nouns that have undergone contraction. These appear with quantity 3 in all forms. The most notable of these are the agent nouns, which were formed in Proto-Samic with the suffix *-jē, but do not have any visible suffix in Northern Sámi anymore.
 Recent loanwords. These may appear with any consonant or cluster permissible in Northern Sámi.

The most common even nouns are the nouns with a stem ending in -a, -i or slightly rarer -u.

Even-syllable nouns with a stem ending in -á, -e or -o also exist, but are much rarer.

Even nouns with four or more syllables sometimes drop the final vowel in the nominative singular. Consequently, simplification of the final consonant occurs. The stem of these nouns always ends in -a.

Odd nouns

Nouns with odd inflection are not distinguished by the stem-final vowel, all use the same set of endings. They can be divided into two types, gradating and non-gradating nouns:
 Non-gradating odd nouns originate from Proto-Samic nouns ending in a vowel. They have the same stem in all forms, with no gradation, although the last consonant(s) may be modified word-finally in the nominative singular. 
 Gradating odd nouns originate from Proto-Samic nouns ending in a consonant. They have consonant gradation, where the weak grade appears in the nominative and essive singular, and the strong grade appears in the remaining forms. The vowels i and u change to á and o respectively in the last syllable of the strong-grade stem, caused by a former Proto-Samic *ë in the endings. The stem-final consonants -g, -m and -n disappear in the weak-grade forms, so that the essive ending is attached directly to the preceding vowel.

The following table shows three gradating odd nouns.

Contracted nouns

Nouns with contracted inflection are in origin gradating odd nouns, mostly with a stem ending in -j or -s, sometimes also -ž (in ).

In the strong-grade forms, the last-syllable vowel is modified as in gradating odd nouns. However, the stem-final consonant has been lost, causing contraction of the two neighbouring syllables. The preceding consonant cluster receives compensatory lengthening, making them quantity 3 regardless of original length. Consequently, the strong grade forms of such nouns have an even number of syllables and receive the same endings as even nouns, but do not gradate.

In the weak-grade forms, the original uncontracted form is usually preserved. The original final consonant -j has been lost after the vowels u and i, so that it does not appear in any of the forms anymore.

Possessive suffixes

The possessive suffixes are similar in meaning to the English personal possessive determiners my, your, their and so on. There are 9 possessive suffixes: one for each person in singular, dual and plural. Possessive suffixes attach to the end of a noun, after the case ending. Thus, for example, ruovttus "in a house" may become ruovttustan "in my house".

Like noun case endings, the suffixes have different forms depending on whether they are attached to a stem with an even or odd number of syllables, and (in the case of even-syllable stems) depending on the last vowel of the stem. The following table shows the suffixes:

The suffixes attach to a combination of noun plus case ending, so the stem that the suffix is attached to may not be the stem of the noun. Rather, a new "possessive stem" is formed from the noun with its case ending included. This stem is not always identical to the ending of the noun on its own; some case endings undergo modifications or the addition of a final vowel. Thus, certain cases may have possessive stems that inherently end in -a, other cases may have -i, but this is only significant if the combination has an even number of syllables.

The following table shows the possessive stems for each case, for four of the nouns whose inflection was given above. If the stem ends in a vowel, it is even and the suffixes with the matching vowel are used. If the stem ends in a consonant, it is odd and the odd endings are used.

In the comitative plural, the possessive suffix attaches between the possessive stem and the final -guin.

As can be seen in the table, for the nominative, accusative and genitive singular cases, the possessive stem is identical to the noun stem. The stem also undergoes consonant gradation in the accusative and genitive singular forms, and endings beginning with e or o also trigger diphthong simplification. The noun is in the strong grade with the first-person possessive suffixes, and in the weak grade with the second- and third-person possessives.

The possessive forms of ruoktu are:

Adjectives

Adjectives inflect the same as nouns do, and have the same cases and inflection types.

Attributive form

Adjectives also have an additional form, the attributive form (attribuhttahápmi). This form is used when the adjective is used attributively, where it precedes the noun. The attributive does not receive any endings, so it does not have cases or number. Its formation is also unpredictable: for some adjectives, it's formed from the nominative singular by adding an extra ending of some kind to the stem, while for others the attributive is formed by removing part of the stem. It may also be identical to the nominative singular. Some examples:

Not all adjectives have an attributive form. For example, the frequently-used adjective buorre "good" has only case forms. When there is no attributive form, this doesn't mean it can't be used attributively. Instead, the case and number of the adjective matches that of the noun it is an attribute of (as in for example Finnish).

Comparison

Pronouns and determiners

Personal pronouns

The personal pronouns inflect irregularly, and also have a third number, the dual (guvttiidlohku). The dual is used to refer to exactly two people. The following table shows the forms.

Demonstratives

The five demonstrative determiners/pronouns inflect somewhat irregularly as well. The nominative singular and nominative plural are identical, and some other cases have endings not found in nouns.

When these words modify a noun rather than standing alone, the demonstrative is in the same case as the noun, with the following exceptions:
 A noun in the illative or locative singular is preceded by a demonstrative in the accusative/genitive singular form.
 A noun in the comitative plural is preceded by a demonstrative in either the comitative or the accusative/genitive plural form.

Interrogatives

The interrogative/relative pronouns/determiners gii "who" and mii "what" are likewise irregular.

In the accusative singular of mii, there are two possible forms. The "regular" form man is used when there is an implication of a choice from a limited number of options. The form máid has no such implication.

These two pronouns, as well as other interrogatives (which inflect regularly) can act as determiners and modify nouns. The rules for which case to use are the same as for the demonstrative. The form máid is followed by a noun in the accusative plural form.

Reflexive pronoun

The reflexive pronoun is ieš (dual and plural ieža), meaning myself, yourself, himself, herself and so on. In its base form, the pronoun occurs only in the nominative case and is never used on its own; it always occurs next to the subject of the sentence, where it acts as an adverb to strengthen it. Compare for example sentences such as I myself have never seen it..

The other cases can occur by themselves, but only in the singular, and are always used in combination with a possessive suffix that matches the subject of the sentence (i.e. always I see myself, never I see himself). These forms are irregular as well as suppletive: the illative and locative forms derive from completely different roots. There are also several alternative stems.

Verbs

Finite verbal categories
The conjugation of Northern Sámi verbs resembles that of Finnish. There are three grammatical persons (persovnnat), and three grammatical numbers (logut), singular, dual and plural. There are four or five grammatical moods (vuogit):
 indicative (indikatiiva or duohtavuohki), indicating real events or statements of fact.
 imperative (imperatiiva or gohččunvuohki), indicating commands.
 optative (optatiiva or ávžžuhusvuohki), indicating wishes, things that the speaker would like to see done or realised. The optative is not usually considered a distinct mood, but is generally combined with the imperative.
 conditional (konditionála or eaktovuohki), indicating conditional or hypothetical statements, like the English subjunctive and the verb "would".
 potential (potientiála or veadjinvuohki), indicating ability or possibility.

Tense is also distinguished, but only in the indicative. There are two tenses (tempusat):
 present (preseansa or dálá áigi), which is also used for future events (nonpast tense).
 past (preterihtta or vássán áigi).

In addition, each mood and tense has a so-called connegative form. This form is used in negative sentences, when combined with the negative verb.

Non-finite verbal categories

Finally, there are several non-finite forms.

Infinitive
The infinitive is the dictionary form of the verb.

Present participle
The present participle is an adjective indicating a current or ongoing action. It is identical in form to the agent noun, and has the same origin. However, the participle has only an attributive form, no case forms.
 oađˈđi mánná – a sleeping child
 áhpásmeaddji buohcci – a recovering patient

Past participle
The past participle is an adjective indicating a past or completed action. Like the present participle, it has only an attributive form. It is also used in forming the periphrastic perfect tense, and as the connegative form of the past indicative.
 oađđán mánná – child who slept
 áhpásman buohcci – patient who recovered

Agent participle
The agent participle is an adjective indicating a past or completed action that has been completed by a particular agent. It only exists for transitive verbs. The agent precedes the participle and is in the genitive case, much like its Finnish counterpart:
 áhči čállin reive – the letter written by the father

Negative participle
The negative participle is an adjective indicating an action that has not been done by or to something. It can be either active or passive in meaning.
 logakeahtẹs reive – unread letter
 jugakeahtẹs vuola – undrunk beer
 muitalkeahtẹs muitalus – untold story

Action noun
The action noun is a noun which indicates the action itself. It is not a verb form as such, but is often used in verbal constructions.

Action inessive
The action inessive (also called the "action essive") indicates "in (the process of)" or "while". It is used together with the copula leat to express a current, ongoing action, much like the English continuous.
 mánná lea oađđimin – the child is sleeping
 mun lean juhkamin vuola – I am drinking beer

The action inessive originates in the inessive case of the action noun, a case which no longer exists for nouns in Northern Sámi.

Action elative
The action elative (also called the "action locative") indicates "from (the action of)". It is used to indicate the cessation of an action, but is also required idiomatically by certain verbs.

 mun vajálduhtin oađđimis – I forgot to sleep

The action elative originates in the elative case of the action noun, a case which became the locative in regular nouns.

Action comitative
The action comitative indicates "through" or "by". It originates in the comitative case of the action noun.

Purposive converb
The purposive converb expresses "in order to".

Simultaneous converb
The simultaneous converb expresses that an action took place "during" or "while (doing)" another one. It is always accompanied by a possessive suffix.

Negative converb
The negative converb (also called the "verb abessive") expresses "without".

Verb genitive
The verb genitive is an adverbial form often used to indicate the way/method, accompanied by a verb of motion. It only exists for some verbs and is not very productive, so it is better considered a derivational form rather than an inflectional form.

Supine
The supine expresses "in order to". It is only used in western Northern Sámi dialects.

Verbs with even inflection

Verbs with odd inflection

Verbs with contracted inflection

Negative verb

Northern Sámi, like other Uralic languages, has a negative verb that conjugates according to mood (indicative and imperative), person (1st, 2nd and 3rd) and number (singular, dual and plural). It does not conjugate according to tense.

Numbers

Northern Sámi uses a decimal numeral system. Cardinal numbers inflect like adjectives, but have no attributive form. Instead, the numeral matches the noun it modifies in case and number. All numerals except for okta (1) use the nominative singular form also for the accusative singular (both are in the same consonant grade). For čieža (7), gávcci (8), ovcci (9), logi (10) and čuođi (100), the genitive singular form is used also for the nominative and accusative singular (they're all in the weak grade). In the plural, they inflect like all other nominals.

0-10
The numbers from 0 to 10 are:

11-19
The numbers 11 to 19 are formed by compounding a number from 1 to 9 with -nuppẹlohkái (literally "into the second ten").

20-99

The decades 20 to 90 are formed by simply compounding the multiple with logi.

Combinations of a decade and a unit are constructed by compounding the decade with the unit directly, as in English. For example:

 28 guoktẹlogigávcci
 83 gávccilogigolbma
 99 ovccilogiovcci

Hundreds

100 is čuođi. Multiples of 100 are expressed like multiples of 10, by simple compounding: 200 guoktẹčuođi, 300 golbmačuođi and so on. Combinations of a hundred and a lower number follow the same pattern, again by compounding, with the hundred coming first.

 112 čuođiguoktẹnuppelohkái
 698 guhttačuođiovccilogigávcci
 999 ovccičuođiovccilogiovcci

Thousands

1000 is duhát. The pattern is the same as with the hundreds.

 5 203 vihttaduhátguoktẹčuođigolbma
 9 001 ovcciduhátokta
 32 348 golbmalogiduhátgolbmačuođinjealljẹlogigávcci
 123 456 čuođiguoktẹlogigolbmaduhátnjealljẹčuođivihttalogiguhtta

Millions and above

Northern Sámi uses the long scale system.

 1 000 000 miljovdna
 1 000 000 000 miljárda
 1 000 000 000 000 biljovdna
 1 000 000 000 000 000 biljárda
 etc.

Combinations with lower numbers are much the same as with the thousands. Multiples use the accusative/genitive forms miljovnna and miljárdda instead.

 117 401 067 čuođilogičiežamiljovnnanjealljẹčuođioktaduhátguhttalogičieža
 10 987 654 321 logimiljárddaovccičuođigávccilogičiežamiljovnnaguhttačuođivihttaloginjealljẹduhátgolbmačuođiguoktẹlogiokta

Ordinal numbers

Ordinal numbers behave and inflect like regular adjectives. Except for nubbi, they have an attributive form, which is identical to the nominative singular.

For the vast majority of numbers, the ordinal form is created by suffixing -t, and putting the stem in the weak grade. The final vowel of the stem is often altered as well.

When a number is composed of multiple parts, only the last one is converted to an ordinal, the rest stay in their cardinal form. Thus, 13th golbmanuppẹlogát, 22nd guoktẹloginubbi, 409th njealljẹčuođiovccát, 9001st ovcciduhátvuosttaš.

Syntax

Northern Sámi is, like English, an SVO language.

References

External links

 Say it in Saami Yle's colloquial Northern Saami-Inari Saami-Skolt Saami-English phrasebook online
 Bustávat davvisámegillii Northern Saami alphabet by the Finnish Saami Parliament
 Northern Sámi to Norwegian Bokmål online machine translation (translates text, docx, urls)
 Interactive morphology-enriched Northern Saami <-> Norwegian / Finnish dictionary
 Dependency-parsed searchable 25m word Northern Saami corpus
  A Northern Sámi-English vocabulary (5500+ words in Sámi as of 12 September 2013)
 Names of birds found in Sápmi in a number of languages, including Skolt Sámi and English. Search function only works with Finnish input though.
 OAHPA! Online interactive Sámi pedagogical program suite
 Sámi language technology project
 Sámi dictionary and terminology database
 Sámi proofing tools project
 Sátnemeahccái project for children
 Gradation described
 Wordlist with sound files
 Irja Seurujärvi-Kari talking in Northern Sámi
 Lexin picture themes – Northern Sámi
 Sámi alphabet – Flash/Sound

 
Sámi in Finland
Sámi in Norway
Sámi in Sweden
Western Sámi languages
Languages of Finland
Languages of Norway
Languages of Sweden
Subject–verb–object languages